All India Adivasi Mahasabha is the tribal wing of the Communist Party of India. Manish Kunjam is the current president of the organization.

References

Communist Party of India mass organisations
Organizations with year of establishment missing